Myken Lighthouse is a coastal lighthouse in Rødøy Municipality in Nordland county, Norway.

It was established in 1918 and was automated in 1975. The occulting light is white, red, or green light depending on direction, occulting once every six seconds. The light burns continuously from 1 August until 5 May each year. The light is not on during May through July due to the midnight sun.

See also

Lighthouses in Norway
List of lighthouses in Norway

References

External links
 Norsk Fyrhistorisk Forening 

Lighthouses completed in 1918
Rødøy
Lighthouses in Nordland
Listed lighthouses in Norway